Poland competed at the 1984 Winter Olympics in Sarajevo, Yugoslavia.

Alpine skiing

Women

Cross-country skiing

Men

Figure skating

Ice hockey

Group A
Top two teams (shaded ones) advanced to the medal round.

USSR 12-1 Poland
West Germany 8-5 Poland
Italy 6-1 Poland
Sweden 10-1 Poland
Poland 8-1 Yugoslavia

Game for 7th Place

|}

Ski jumping

Speed skating

Women

References
Official Olympic Reports
 Olympic Winter Games 1984, full results by sports-reference.com

Nations at the 1984 Winter Olympics
1984
1984 in Polish sport